Sistanova were a German girl group from Frankfurt am Main, which was founded in 2005. They were the first girl group in Germany singing German language R&B music.

History
KeyLiza was born on December 11, 1989 in Hanau and moved to Frankfurt am Main. Her parents are from Angola and Democratic Republic of the Congo. When she was five years old she made friends with Rola who was born on 12, February 1990 in Accra, capital of Ghana. Rolas mother is from Ghana, her father is Lebanese of Armenian descent. With three years she came to Frankfurt where she grew up with her mother and her stepfather who is from Bayern. KeyLiza and Rola began to dance together and sing and imitating their favorite bands and artists like the Spice Girls, TLC, Michael Jackson and Destiny's Child. As they always did everything together they sang in school events, attended dance classes, piano and theater groups, and wrote they first song at eleven years old. In 2004 they met Viviane.
Vivianes Father is from Cameroon and her mother Indonesian of Chinese descent. She was born on 2, June 1989 in Bad Homburg and spent many years in Indonesia and Paris and returned to Germany.

The band performed at regional competitions and recorded demos under the name Black Supremes. In 2005 The production team Noizemakers and Christopher Applegate, took the Black Supremes under the new name Sistanova under contract. In 2006, the band was signed to the record company Warner Music Germany.

On 21 September 2007, their first single 'Was ist los?'(What's going on?) was released, produced by Thomas Troelsen which debuted at #76 in the German Singles Chart and at #24 in the German Urban Charts. In November 2007 Sistanova entered as the opening act of the US singer Rihanna at four concerts. In addition, they still supported the band as the opening act for Hip Hop group Rapsoul throughout Germany and Austria.

On 5 December 2008, their debut album was released Unglaublich.

In 2010, the band broke up. According to their MySpace page all the band members will go on a solo career.

Discography

Singles

Studio albums
 Unglaublich
 Was Ist Los - EP

Promotional singles

 Unglaublich
 Leben
 Sexy Girl 
 Ziele with Thomas Anders of Modern Talking HelleWecks Soundtrack
 Mama
 Unsere Stadt
 Es Ist Vorbei

Tours
Opening act
Rihanna - Good Girl Gone Bad Tour 
 November 13, 2007 - in Munich - Zenith
 November 20, 2007 - in Cologne - Palladium
 November 23, 2007 - in Frankfurt - Jahrhunderthalle
 November 26, 2007 - in Berlin  - Columbiahalle

Opening act
Rapsoul - Achterbahn Tour
NRJ Music Tour

See also
KeyLiza
Good Girl Gone Bad Tour
Thomas Anders

References

Musical groups established in 2007
German dance music groups
German girl groups
German pop music groups
German contemporary R&B musical groups
Musical groups disestablished in 2010
German musical trios